Ozaukee High School is a public high school located in Fredonia, Wisconsin, United States. It serves students from Fredonia, Newburg, and parts of Belgium and Saukville.

Athletics
Ozaukee's athletic teams are nicknamed the Warriors and the school's colors are navy and gold. The Warriors compete in the Big East Conference. The Warriors compete in the following sports:

Boys cross country
Girls cross country
Football
Boys soccer
Girls volleyball
Boys basketball
Girls basketball
Wrestling
Boys baseball
Boys golf
Girls soccer
Girls softball
Boys track & field
Girls track & field

Demographics
For the 2019-2020 school year, Ozaukee had an enrollment of 217 with 204 students identifying as Caucasian, making up a majority of the student body. Six identified as Hispanic, three identified as Black, one identified as Asian, and three identified as multiracial.

Notable alumni
Owen Miller (2015) - MLB shortstop for the Cleveland Indians

References

External links 
 Official website

Public high schools in Wisconsin
Schools in Ozaukee County, Wisconsin